The table below lists the judgments of the Constitutional Court of South Africa delivered in 2022.

The members of the court at the start of 2022 were Deputy Chief Justice and Acting Chief Justice Raymond Zondo, and judges Mbuyiseli Madlanga, Steven Majiedt, Nonkosi Mhlantla, Leona Theron, Zukisa Tshiqi, as well as two newly appointed judges, Jody Kollapen and Rammaka Mathopo, who began their terms on 1 January.

This left three vacancies on the court, including the Chief Justice position.

President Cyril Ramaphosa elevated Raymond Zondo to the position of Chief Justice effective 1 April 2022, and announced his intention to nominate Justice Mandisa Maya as Deputy Chief Justice at the same time.

In June 2022, Ramaphosa appointed Owen Rogers, who had been acting since 2021, to the Court, with his term commencing on 1 August 2022.
On 25 July 2022, President Cyril Ramaphosa appointed President of the Supreme Court of Appeal Mandisa Maya as Deputy Chief Justice. Her term will start on 1 September 2022. She will be the first woman to be appointed to the position.

References
 

2022
Constitutional Court